Scratch is the soundtrack to the 2001 documentary Scratch directed by Doug Pray.  Scratch examines cultural and historical perspectives on the birth and evolution of hip-hop disc jockeys (DJs), scratching and turntablism and includes interviews with some of hip-hop's most famous and respected DJs.

Track list
"Prologue - Grand Wizard Theodore Speaks" (Grand Wizard Theodore)
"Mixmaster Mike and DJ Disk Live" (Mix Master Mike, DJ Disk)
"Primo's X-Ecution" (X-Ecutioners feat. DJ Premier)
"Re-Animator" (Rob Swift)
"Interlude - Mixmaster Mike Speaks" (Mix Master Mike)
"Rockit 2.002" (Herbie Hancock, feat. Mix Master Mike, Grandmixer DXT, Rob Swift, Q-Bert, Babu, Faust, Shortee)
"Interlude - Cut Chemist" (Cut Chemist)
"Turntable Transformer" (Cat Five VS Snake Eyez)
"Interlude - Interlude"
"DJ Krush - Live" (DJ Krush) 
"Crazy 2 Crazy" (Grandmixer DXT)
"Interlude - DJ Shadow Speaks" (DJ Shadow) 
"Invasion of the Octopus People" (Invisibl Skratch Piklz) 
"Interlude - Jazzy Jay and Afrika Bambaataa Speak" (Jazzy Jay, Afrika Bambaataa)
"All 4 One" (Boogie Boy, Kidd Delight, Afrika Bambaataa)
"Interlude - Afrika Bambaataa Speaks Again" (Afrika Bambaataa) 
"Skin Cracked Canals" (DJ Disk) 
"Interlude - Interlude"
"Cut Transmitter" (Grandmixer DXT) 
"Universal Noize Maker" (Eddie Def)
"Interlude - Q-Bert and Mixmaster Mike Speak" (Q-Bert, Mix Master Mike) 
"My Style" (Rob Swift)

2002 soundtrack albums
Documentary film soundtracks